Jakub Cieciura (born 3 February 1983) is a Polish professional footballer who plays as a midfielder for Powiślanka Lipsko.

Career

Club
On 24 February 2006, he moved to GKS Bełchatów.
In February 2009, he moved to GKP Gorzów Wielkopolski on a one and a half year contract. In summer 2009, he joined KSZO Ostrowiec on a two-year contract.

In June 2011, he signed a one-year contract with Olimpia Grudziądz.

References

External links
 
 

1983 births
Living people
Polish footballers
MG MZKS Kozienice players
UKS SMS Łódź players
Stal Głowno players
Radomiak Radom players
GKS Bełchatów players
ŁKS Łódź players
Stilon Gorzów Wielkopolski players
KSZO Ostrowiec Świętokrzyski players
Olimpia Grudziądz players
I liga players
II liga players
People from Lipsko County
Sportspeople from Masovian Voivodeship
Association football midfielders